The Croatia men's national water polo team represents Croatia in international water polo competitions and is controlled by the Croatian Water Polo Federation. They have won gold medals in the Olympics, World and European Championships, FINA World League and Mediterranean Games, making them one of the most successful men's water polo teams in the world. Overall Croatia won 28 medals at competitions.

It was the first Croatian national team to win a gold medal at the Olympics or World Games, the World and European Championships.

Croatia played their 800th game since gaining independence on 20th August 2022. and they won their 517th victory.

History
After the independence of Croatia the national water polo team competed at its first tournament and also its first finals at 1993 Mediterranean Games, followed by the 1993 European Championships where Croatia won 5th place.

Croatia has since become Olympic champion (2012), double World champion (2007, 2017) and European champion (2010). Croatia has also won eight other medals at the Olympic Games, World Championships and European Championships and was fourth on six occasions. The team holds a record streak of winning 7 medals in a row at World Championships and has reached semi-finals in over 60% of appearances at the Olympic Games, World Championships and European Championships altogether since 2017. Since the formation of national team Croatia has qualified for every big tournament. It is the first Croatian national team in any Olympic team sport that has won gold medals at all three big competitions. Croatia has also won World League (2012) and Mediterranean Games (2013). The only competition Croatia has yet to win is World Cup where the national team won silver medal in 2010.

The team has been awarded with Franjo Bučar State Award for Sport in 1996. So far two International Swimming Hall of Fame inductees have been members of Croatia national team – Perica Bukić as a player and Ratko Rudić as a coach.

Croatia played their 800 game since gaining independence on 20th August 2022. and they won their 517 victory which makes 64,62% of victories.

Results

Medals
Updated after 2022 Men's European Water Polo Championship

 Champions   Runners-up   Third place   Fourth place

Summer Olympics

Record against other teams at the Summer Olympics

World Championships

Record against other teams at the World Championships

World Cup

Record against other teams at the World Cup

World League
Wins/Defeats after penalty shootout counted as wins/defeats.
* marks instances of not qualifying for the super final due to "host rule".

European Championships

Record against other teams at the European Championships

LEN Europa Cup

Mediterranean Games

Team

Current squad
Roster for the 2022 European Championship in Split, Croatia.

Player statistics

Most appearances

bold – not retired from national team

Top scorers

Head coaches
Duško Antunović (1991–1993)
Bruno Silić (1993–1998)
Neven Kovačević (1998–2001)
Veselin Đuho (2002–2003)
Zoran Roje (2003–2005)
Ratko Rudić (2005–2012)
Ivica Tucak (2012–)

Notable players
Milivoj Bebić
Zdravko Ježić
Zdravko Kovačić
Renco Posinković
Karlo Stipanić

Naturalized players
Andrey Belofastov (Ukraine), Xavier García (Spain) Faris Okanovic (Sweden)

Statistics

Record against other teams
As of 11 September 2022

NO FRIENDLY fixtures.

Biggest wins
double digit goal difference

Biggest losses

Non-senior competitions

World Youth Championship
U-18

World Junior Championship
U-20

European Youth Championship
U-17

* incorporated in the 1st European Games

European Junior Championship
U-19

Awards
 Croatian team of the year: 1999, 2017, 2010, 2011, 2012, 2017

See also
 Croatia men's Olympic water polo team records and statistics
 Yugoslavia men's national water polo team
 List of Olympic champions in men's water polo
 List of men's Olympic water polo tournament records and statistics
 List of world champions in men's water polo

Notes

References

External links
 

Men's national water polo teams
 
Men's sport in Croatia